Richard Oakes Crawshay (12 April 1882 – 31 January 1953) was a British fencer, the son of Richard Frederick Crawshay, J.P. and D.L., of Ty Mawr, Abergavenny, Brecknockshire by his wife Tempe Isabella, daughter of Colonel Edward Oakes. He was the great-grandson of William Crawshay (1788-1867), great-great-grandson of William Crawshay (1762-1834), and great-great-great grandson of Richard Crawshay, who owned the Cyfarthfa Ironworks at Merthyr Tydfil.

Crawshay was educated at Harrow. He attained the rank of Lieutenant in the Grenadier Guards. In 1907 he married Ann, the youngest daughter of Lazarus Threlfall Baines, of Westbrook, and divorced her in 1915 having had no children.

Crawshay competed in the team sabre event at the 1912 Summer Olympics.

References

External links
 

1882 births
1953 deaths
People educated at Harrow School
British male fencers
Olympic fencers of Great Britain
Fencers at the 1912 Summer Olympics
Sportspeople from Kensington